Diokeli  is a village and commune in the Cercle of Bafoulabé in the Kayes Region of south-western Mali. Although Diokeli is the administrative centre (chef-lieu), the largest village is Diakaba. In the 2009 census the commune had a population of 16,023.

References

Communes of Kayes Region